Brad is a city in Hunedoara County in the Transylvania region of Romania. Its name comes from the Romanian word brad, "fir".

Geography
The city is located in the northern part of the county, at the foot of the Metaliferi Mountains. It lies in the valleys of the river Crișul Alb and its tributaries, Brad and Luncoiu. Five villages are administered by the city: Mesteacăn ("birch"; Mesztákon), Potingani (Pottingány), Ruda-Brad (Ruda), Țărățel (Cerecel) and Valea Bradului ("the valley of the fir tree"; Vályabrád).

History
A gold mine in the area began to be exploited in Roman times, and the town developed around it. The earliest documentary mention of Brad dates to 1445. Gold mining was active until 2006. There is a Gold Museum.

Buildings and monuments
The Brad railway station is listed as a historic monument. The central plaza of Brad features a copy of the Capitoline Wolf, near the Dacian Draco.

Demographics

 Romanians - 13,534 (97.3%)
 Romani - 192 (1.38%)
 Hungarians - 127 (0.91%)
 Germans - 19 (0.13%)
 Others - 33

Natives
Cătălin Bălescu
Gavril Blajek
Ilarion Felea
Florin Maxim
Teodor Meleșcanu
László Pataky
Ileana Stana-Ionescu

References

 
Populated places in Hunedoara County
Localities in Transylvania
Cities in Romania
Mining communities in Romania